İpek Kıraç graduated from Koç School in 2002 and from Brown University Department of Biology in 2007. During her undergraduate studies at Brown University, she gained research experience at Cecil B. Day Laboratory for Neuromuscular Research at UMass Medical School led by Dr. Robert H. Brown, a leading researcher in ALS. She also gained clinical experience via a summer internship at Istanbul American Hospital’s Department of Physical Medicine and Rehabilitation led by Prof. Ender Berker.

Between 2012 and 2021, she was the CEO of Sirena Marine Maritime Industry and Trade Inc., transforming the company from a contract manufacturer to producer of luxury sail and motorboats under a newly created brand, placing the company among the 500 largest exporting companies in Turkey. Excellence in production and brand recognition also resulted in the company becoming a preferred supplier for defense and automotive projects. Under her leadership, the company’s turnover grew by 5 times in less than 10 years and profitability increased by 20 times during the same period, turning the company into a major global player in the industry. She continues to be Chairwoman of the Board of Directors.

İpek Kıraç is also a Founding Member of the Board of Suna and İnan Kıraç Foundation. She recently launched Suna’nin Kizları (Suna’s Daughters-named after her mother Suna), an education initiative which will be taking a multi-dimensional and holistic approach for creating ecosystems of support that will empower girls to identify and pursue their dreams. She also launched SemtPati (neighborhood paws) Foundation working on the welfare of stray animals by using digital technologies and by mobilizing 25.000 registered volunteers around data-based solutions.

Kıraç is a Member of the Board of Directors of Vehbi Koç Foundation, Temel Trade and Investment Inc., American Hospital (Moment Health Services Trade Inc.), Zer Central Services Inc., Arçelik Marketing Inc. and Setur Service Touristic Inc.

In addition, Kıraç continues to work as the Chairwoman of the Board of Directors of Koç School and as a Member of the Board of Trustees of Koç University, Galatasaray Education Foundation and both Member of the Board and Member of the Board of Trustees of Educational Volunteers Foundation of Turkey (TEGV).

She has been a Member of Koç Holding Board of Directors since 2016.

References 
https://www.koc.com.tr/about-us/board-of-directors/ipek-kirac

Turkish billionaires
Brown University alumni
Female billionaires
Turkish women in business
1984 births
Living people